Ray Mallock Ltd., also known as RML Group, is a motorsports and high performance engineering company, based in Wellingborough, Northamptonshire, United Kingdom.

Early history
Ray Mallock began building racing cars, alongside his brother Richard, as an assistant to his father, Major Arthur Mallock, who created the Mallock U2 chassis for Clubmans racing. After racing in Formula 3, Formula Atlantic and sports car racing, Mallock founded his team, Ray Mallock Atlantic Racing, in 1979, which he renamed RML in 1984.

Sports car racing
Ray Mallock, a driver for Viscount Downe Racing, helped develop the privateer Aston Martin-powered Nimrod NRA/C2 for Group C regulations in the World Endurance Championship in 1982, 1983 and 1984. In 1984, RML was contracted to build the Ecurie Ecosse prototypes for the C2 class, winning the class title in 1986.

In 1987, RML returned to the main class by developing the Aston Martin AMR-1. The project was closed in 1990, but RML found work with the works Nissan team instead. RML developed and prepared NPTI's Nissan R90CK programme for Le Mans. One of the cars manages to lead the race for five hours and set a new lap record.

In 1999, RML returned sportscars by producing the RML Mallock P20 Supersports Car, in association with Mallock Sports his brother Richard's company. The car won the National Supersports championships in 1999 and in 2000, when it was driven by Michael Mallock.

In 2000, RML created the Saleen S7 supercar initially as a road car, and then the racing version the S7-R, winning the European Le Mans Series in the GT1 class in 2001 and the Spanish GT Championship overall in 2002. In 2004 RML entered the FIA GT Championship with two cars.

Also in 2004, RML ran an MG-Lola EX257 in the Le Mans 24 Hours and Le Mans Endurance Series. After the design became obsolete with the onset of new LMP2 regulations, RML merged components from the EX257 into the Lola B05/40's chassis and bodyshell, creating the MG-Lola EX264, which won Le Mans in the LMP2 class in 2005 and 2006.

The team's car was further upgraded for the 2008 Le Mans Series season, using a new XP21 motor developed by MG, and renaming the car EX265.  This car was then replaced before the season finale by a coupe bodystyle, based on the new Lola B08/80.  Using components of the EX265, including the MG XP21 motor, the new car was christened the EX265C, and made its debut at the 2008 1000km of Silverstone.

In 2009, the team turned to the Mazda MZR-R turbocharged engine in the back of the Lola B08/80, abandoning the MG moniker, but issues with the spec fuel caused several engine failures over the season, the car finishing only twice over the whole season. For the 2010 season, the team is retaining the Lola B08/80 chassis, but with a normally aspirated V8 engine developed by Honda Performance Development, the same engine used in the HPD ARX-01.

RML competed in the Le Mans Series in 2011 with a HPD ARX-01d LMP2 car, becoming the second team to run the ARX-01 in Europe after Strakka Racing.

In 2012, RML developed a new engine on behalf of Nissan for the unique Nissan DeltaWing RML, as Nissans Motorpsort Partner ran the car and provided engineering and technical support at Le Mans 24 hours and Petit Le Mans where it finished 5th overall.

For 2014, RML were engaged to design and build the Nissan ZEOD RC, an innovative race car designed to run in Le Mans Garage 56. The car was the first to switch between Electric and Petrol powered Propulsion. RML were responsible for the whole vehicle, including developing a high performance lightweight powertrain. The engine was a new RML design, a 3-cylinder 1.5 litre weighing only 40 kg and producing over 400 bhp. The ZOED RC suffered a gearbox failure due to a new part with a material defect early in the 24 hour race, however in practice had achieved the first ever all electric lap of Le Mans and over 300 km/h on in Electric mode.

Touring Car Racing

British Touring Car Championship

Vauxhall (1992–1996)
Taking advantage of its relationship to Ecurie Ecosse, RML made its debut in touring car racing in 1992, by moving to the British Touring Car Championship. The team ran two semi-works Vauxhall Cavaliers for Ecurie Ecosse for two years.

RML built its first ground up Super touring car the Vauxhall Cavalier RML P7 in 1993, it took RML's maiden BTCC victory with David Leslie at the wheel at Thruxton.  

Due to the teams success, RML was awarded with the works Vauxhall contract in 1994 taking over from Dave Cook Racing, winning the championship the following year. The RML Vauxhall Cavalier RML P11 won the 1995 in both the teams and Drivers standings. Vauxhall launched the new Vectra RML P12 for 1996. The season was a transitional year with the team scoring just one victory with James Thompson.

Nissan (1997–1999)
RML's association with Nissan in touring car racing began with the design of South African Touring car championship Sentra RML P8 in 1993, It grew in 1997 moving on from Vauxhall to become the works partner for Nissan in Super Touring, being responsible for the build, development and operation of the BTCC cars as well as the build of the cars for the German and Japanese series. 

The team won the BTCC manufactures and teams titles in 1998 & 1999 with RML project numbers P17 & P18 respectively and the manufactures, teams and drivers championship in 1999 with Laurent Aïello.

SEAT (2004)

In 2004, RML contracted with SEAT Sport UK to run two SEAT Toledo Cupras in the BTCC with drivers Jason Plato and Rob Huff, at the end of the year RML moved into the WTCC with Chevrolet.

Chevrolet (2009–2011)
RML re-entered the BTCC in 2009, running their ex-WTCC Chevrolet Lacettis for 2001 champion Jason Plato, Mat Jackson since round two and James Nash since round four. Their 2009 campaign has brought good results, taking 11 wins and Plato taking second in the drivers championship. In 2010, RML ran the Works Chevrolet team in the BTCC, winning the drivers championship with Jason Plato. On 1 February 2012, Chevrolet announced that they will be pulling out of the BTCC to focus on the WTCC, therefore RML will not be taking part in the 2012 BTCC season.

World Touring Car Championship

Chevrolet (2005–2012)
RML won the contract to build, develop and run the works Chevrolet Lacetti in the WTCC from the 2005 season. The Lacetti won 1 race in its first year, 7 wins in 2007 and 5 wins in 2008. In 2009 the  new Chevrolet Cruze was introduced and took 6 wins in the first year. In 2010, the Chevrolet team won both the Manufacturers Championship by a substantial 74 points and, with Yvan Muller, won the Drivers Championship. The RML Chevrolet team won the WTCC again in 2011 with Muller and again in 2012 with Rob Huff. On 4 July 2012, Chevrolet Europe announced that the 2012 season will be the last for the Chevrolet WTCC team.

Independent entry (2013)
On 4 March 2013, RML announced they would enter the WTCC in 2013 as an independent two-car entry with Chevrolet Cruzes run for Yvan Muller and new recruit from the closed down Team Aon team, Tom Chilton. Muller will win the 2013 WTCC championship & Chilton finishes 5th overall.

Since 2014, RML develops the Chevrolet Cruze to the new 2014 TC1 specs for various teams, but did not field a team.

South African Touring Car Championship
RML built the works Nissan Sentra for the South African Touring Car Championship.

Rallying
At the end of 1997, Opel decided to cut down its involvement in touring cars, and contracted RML to the develop the Opel Astra Kit-car for the Formula 2 regulations for them in the World Rally Championship and several national rallying championships in Europe. In 1999, the RML Astra won titles in Germany, Norway and Sweden. 	

In late 2000 Opel assigned RML to design and build the Opel Corsa for the new Super 1600 category, which replaced the F2 kit-cars. The car made its competition debut in the 2002 JWRC class of the Monte Carlo Rally and its first title the following year.

During this period RML were responsible for the build, development and customer support of all Opel Astra and Corsa Rally cars.

Formula One
RML considered lodging an entry for the 2010 Formula One World Championship, however decided against it, citing the current uncertainty over 2010 regulations as their reason for doing so. They were to use Cosworth engines had they submitted an entry.
RML have also said they are still considering an entry into Formula One in the future.

Other series
In 2002, RML entered the British ASCAR stock car series, based on ASA-type racing, winning the 2002 and 2003 titles with Nicolas Minassian and Ben Collins. Also in 2002, RML prepared Darren Manning's Team St. George car for the British Champ Car race at the Rockingham race track.

Road cars
RML's engineering skills were used in road-going cars for the first time in 1990, when the company built a small number of Ford GT40 replicas. In 1994, RML created several concept sketches for an undisclosed Japanese manufacturer.

In 1999, RML returned with two different projects, the Opel Astra Concept DTM, a road-going prototype based on the Opel Astra Coupé the German company would debut the following year, and the ground up design of the Saleen S7.

In 2003, Nissan ordered a prototype based on the new Nissan Micra, powered initially by a  Touring Car race engine (with a 6-speed sequential gearbox), and later by a   Nismo tuned V6 engine and called Micra R. The car debuted in the Geneva Auto Show.

In 2011, RML showcased the Nissan Juke-R with Nissan announcing a limited production run of 'the worlds fastest crossover' in 2012.

In 2014, RML developed and built the Q50 Eau Rouge concept on behalf of Infiniti Motor Co.

RML Group produced a road-legal converted version of the Aston Martin Vulcan some time before 2018.

In 2021, RML showcased the Short Wheelbase, essentially a modern classic inspired by the famed Ferrari 250 GT SWB. Only a few months later, more details surrounding it have been released. As such, only 30 units will be made and will go on sale at the end of 2021.

References

External links

 
 RML AD Group | Sportscar & Endurance Racing, including Le Mans, 2003–2011

British auto racing teams
Auto racing teams established in 1984
1984 establishments in the United Kingdom
24 Hours of Le Mans teams
European Le Mans Series teams
World Touring Car Championship teams
British Touring Car Championship teams
British racecar constructors
FIA GT Championship teams
American Le Mans Series teams